Yailah, New South Wales  is a Parish of Ularara County in north west New South Wales. It is at 29°36′44″S 143°45′01″E between Milparinka, New South Wales and Wilcannia and west of Wanaaring. The main economic activity of the prish is agriculture.

History
The Burke and Wills expedition were the first Europeans to the area, passing a few miles to the west.

Climate 
The climate is semi-arid, featuring low rainfall, very hot summer temperatures and cool nights in winter. 
 The parish has a Köppen climate classification of BWh (Hot desert).

References

Parishes of Ularara County
Far West (New South Wales)